The 2022–23 season is the 130th in the history of SBV Vitesse and their 33rd consecutive season in the top flight. The club are participating in Eredivisie and the KNVB Cup.

Players

Players out on loan

Transfers

In

Out

Pre-season and friendlies

Competitions

Overall record

Eredivisie

League table

Results summary

Results by round

Matches 
The league fixtures were announced on 17 June 2022.

KNVB Cup

References

SBV Vitesse seasons
Vitesse